Katerina Sakellaropoulou (born 30 May 1956) is a Greek judge who has been the president of Greece since 13 March 2020. She was elected by the Hellenic Parliament to succeed Prokopis Pavlopoulos on 22 January 2020. Prior to her election as president, Sakellaropoulou served as president of the Council of State, the highest administrative court of Greece. She is the country's first female president.

Biography 
Sakellaropoulou was born in Thessaloniki. Her parents are Nikolaos Sakellaropoulos, a former vice president of the Greek Supreme Court, and Aliki Paraskeva. Her family comes from Stavroupoli, a town in Xanthi prefecture. She studied law at the National and Kapodistrian University of Athens and completed her postgraduate studies in public law at Paris II University. In the mid-1980s, she was admitted to the Council of State and she was promoted to councellor in 2000. 

In October 2015 she was appointed vice-president of the Council of State, and in October 2018 she became the first female president of the court, following a unanimous vote. Her election came after the Syriza government, which was in power at the time, considered her progressive record on issues such as the environment and human rights.

She has been a member of the Association of Judiciary Functionaries of the Council of State. During her tenure at the association, she has served as its secretary-general (1985–1986), vice-president (2006–2008), and president (1993–1995, 2000–2001).

She publishes regularly in academic journals. She has also contributed to the book Financial crisis and environmental protection on the case law of the Council of State, Papazisis Publications, 2017.

President of Greece 

On 15 January 2020, the Greek prime minister, Kyriakos Mitsotakis, nominated her for the post of president of the Hellenic Republic, a post she was elected to on 22 January 2020 with 261 MPs voting in favour in the 300-seat Parliament.

She took office before the Hellenic Parliament on 13March of that year in a solemn session with few legislators present, as the country was beginning to be severely affected by the COVID-19 pandemic and the first restrictive measures had been ordered.

Personal life 
Sakellaropoulou lives with her partner, Pavlos Kotsonis, a lawyer. She has one child from a previous marriage.

She is an Aris Thessaloniki supporter.

Honours

National honours
 :
 Grand Commander and Grand Cross of the Order of the Redeemer (13 March 2020)
 Grand Commander of the Order of Honour
 Grand Commander of the Order of the Phoenix
 Grand Commander of the Order of Beneficence

Foreign honours
:  Grand Collar of the Order of Makarios III (21 September 2020)
:  Knight Grand Cross with Collar of the Order of Merit of the Italian Republic (6 October 2020)
:  Grand Collar of Order of the Nile (11 November 2020)
:  Member of the Order for Exceptional Merits (2021)
:  Grand Collar of the Order of Prince Henry (28 March 2022)
 :  Grand Cordon of the Order of Leopold (2 May 2022)
 :  Grand Cross of the Order of the White Double Cross (6 September 2022)
:  Knight Grand Cross of the Order of the Netherlands Lion (31 October 2022)
 :  Grand Cross of the Order of the Stara Planina (8 December 2022)

References 

|-

|-

|-

1956 births 
21st-century presidents of Greece
21st-century Greek women politicians
Greek women judges
Living people 
National and Kapodistrian University of Athens alumni
Politicians from Thessaloniki
Presidents of Greece
Presidents of the Council of State (Greece)
Women chief justices
Female heads of state
Women presidents
Grand Collars of the Order of Prince Henry